Allister Coetzee (born  in Makhanda) is a South African rugby union coach and former player, currently in charge of the Namibian national team on a part time basis, whilst also head coach of Rugby Rovigo in Italy. He served as the head coach of the South African national team from April 2016 to February 2018.

Personal

Playing career
Coetzee has been involved with rugby since 1974 – he spent 22 years as a player before retiring at the age of 33 in 1996.

Prior to the unification of different rugby union governing bodies in South Africa, he represented SARU, playing as a scrum-half, between 1985 and 1991 and was captain of their side between 1988 and 1991. He was selected for their squad that competed in the 1994 Super 10 Rugby, though his side failed to secure a single win in the competition.

During his playing career, he was also a teacher at Gelvan Park Primary School in Port Elizabeth, where he worked for fifteen years. He played as a scrum-half and retired at the end of 1996.

Coaching career
Immediately after retiring, Coetzee joined the coaching team at his former club as an assistant, however, his side finished bottom of the 1997 Currie Cup table. However, after the Sharks finished bottom of the table, the coaching team, who had only been in place for a year, was sacked by the club.

In 1998 he earned his first Union appointed coaching role when he coached the Emerging Springboks and a Vodacom All-Stars team in 1999. In 2000 he took a South African Under-23 team, sometimes known as South Africa Amateurs, to the 2000 Africa Cup, competing against the national senior sides of Namibia and Zimbabwe. He convincingly lead the side to top of the South Pool with 4 from 4 wins, to earn the right to compete in the final later in the year. However, Coetzee was later called up to the South African senior side's coaching team by Harry Viljoen for their end of year tour, and missed the final against Morocco - Ian Hattingh led the team as Coetzee's replacement. Under Viljoen, South Africa won 3 from 4 wins on their end of year tour, while Coetzee lead South Africa 'A' in their mid-weeks matches while on tour.

He remained head coach in Port Elizabeth until he resigned in July 2003, haven failed to improve the side in either the Currie Cup or Bankfin Cup. He became a selector for the national team at the end of 2003 season, after Rudolf Straeuli stood down after being knocked-out at the quarter-finals of the 2003 Rugby World Cup.

Jake White was appointed as Straeuli's replacement, and appointed Allister as assistant and backline coach in 2004, where he remained until 2007. He was on the coaching staff of the side that won the 2007 Rugby World Cup.

In 2005, he took up a dual-coaching role when he was appointed backline coach for the  ahead of the 2006 Super 14 season.

Following the end of Jake White's tenure at the Springboks, Coetzee was one of the four main candidates to take over as head coach. He also took over as head coach of  later in 2008, following Gary Gold's decision to become an assistant coach with the Springboks. In his second year in charge of Western Province, the side returned to the knock out stage for the first time in 3 years, however was defeated by the Blue Bulls 21–19.

In just his first season in charge, the Stormers jumped from their 10th-place finish in 2009 to second in the 2010. This was the first time since the 2004 Super 12 season that the Stormers had made the knock out phase of the tournament, and after defeating the New South Wales Waratahs 25–6 in the Semi-finals, this side became the first Stormers to make the final. However they were later beaten by the Bulls 25–17. He also led Western Province to their first Currie Cup final since 2001, finished second behind the Sharks, being beaten 30–10 in the final.

In 2011 and 2012, the Stormers finished as the top South African team during the 2011 and 2012 Super Rugby season's, but was knocked out by the Crusaders, 29–10, in the semi-final in 2011 and the Sharks, 26–19, at the same stage in 2012. In 2013, the Stormers narrowly missed out on the knock out stage, finishing in 7th place on the overall table, but returned to that stage in 2015. However, this time, they were knocked out in the qualifiers round, by the Brumbies 39–19. This was Coetzee's last game in charge of the Cape Town franchise, announcing in early 2015 he would be stepping down from his role at the Stormers and Western Province at the end of the season. He left the side with a 65.5% win rate, 61 wins from 93.

During his time at Western Province, he led the side to four consecutive Currie Cup finals between 2012 and 2015, winning the title in 2012 and 2014.

In October 2015, he joined his Japan based side Kobelco Steelers, where Coetzee led his new side to victory of the Pre-season competition. In his first and only season at the club, Kobelco Steelers finished second in their pool during the 2015–16 Top League. He guided them to the semi-finals, with victory over Kintetsu Liners 42–10 in the quarter-finals, but was defeated by the eventual champions Panasonic Wild Knights by the same scoreline in the semi's.

Head coach of South Africa
On 12 April 2016, he was appointed as the head coach of the South African national team. His first game in charge was a first ever home defeat to Ireland, 26–20, during the two sides three-test series. This defeat came despite South Africa being 1-man up for close to 60 minutes of the game, when Ireland's CJ Stander was red-carded. However, the series was all level after the second test, when South Africa came from behind at half time, 19–3, to win 32–26, and with a third test victory, 19–13, Coetzee led the Sprinboks to a narrow 2–1 series win.

In his first Rugby Championship, he led the team to a third-place finish, 5 points clear of bottom-placed Argentina. He guided his side to a 30–23 win over the Pumas, before losing to Argentina 26–24 for the first time. The Springboks then went on to back-to-back losses to Australia, 23–17, and New Zealand, 41–13, before gaining their second win in the Championship against Australia 18–10 in Pretoria. In the final round of the Championship, New Zealand defeated South Africa 57–15 in Durban, a record win for the All Blacks on South African soil. Following that loss, the SARU organised a debrief between the Springboks coaching staff and all the Super Rugby franchise' managements. It was later revealed that Coetzee had recruited specialist coaches ahead of their 2016 end-of-year tour, including a skills, defence and kicking coach. During their end-of-year tour, Coetzee led the Springboks to a win less tour for the first time since their 2002 tour. They did however draw against the Barbarians 31–all in an uncapped match, before going on to lose to England for the first time in 10 years, 37–21. They later lost to Italy for the first time, 20–18, and a record loss to Wales 27–13, saw South Africa drop to equal worst World Ranking of 6th.

In February 2017, the South African Rugby Union reviewed the Sprigboks 2016 campaign and the performances of the head coach Allister Coetzee. His job was deemed under threat due to the poor season, however the SARU backed Coetzee and it was announced that he will remain as the Springboks coach. Coetzee brought in new coaches around him to form a new coaching staff and management in a bid to have a more successful season. His first campaign under the new management was a three-test series against France. Eight uncapped players were named in the series squad, with five of them gaining their first cap in the opening test - four in the run-on XV. The first test was won convincingly 37–14, which was backed up by a 37–15 in the second test to seal the series. The final test was played at Ellis Park Stadium in Johannesburg, a venue in which South Africa has never beaten France in four attempts. However this time, South Africa saw out the victory, winning 35–15 to win the series 3–0. South Africa started the 2017 Rugby Championship promising with back-to-back wins over Argentina, 37–15 (home) and 41–23 (away). The third saw South Africa draw with Australia, for the first time since 2001, 23–23. The result was repeated in the reverse fixture three weeks later, when it ended 27–27. In the fourth round, South Africa suffered their largest defeat in 111 years, losing to the All Blacks in Albany 57–0, surpassing the previous worst defeat against England 53–3 in 2002. They turned this defeat around, and put in a better performance in against the All Blacks in South Africa, narrowly losing the game 25–24 in Cape Town. Despite a promising end to the Springboks's Rugby Championship campaign, South Africa went on to have a record defeat to Ireland, losing 38–3, before going onto narrowly defeating France 18–17. Their only other victory during their European tour was a 35–6 win over Italy, before going to on to lose for the second year running to Wales, 24–22.

On 2 February 2018, he was sacked by the South African Rugby Union following a run of poor results across his two year tenure.

International matches as head coach
Note: World Rankings Column shows the World Ranking South Africa was placed at on the following Monday after each of their matches

Record by Country

Other honours

South Africa (as assistant coach)
IRB Team of the Year (South Africa)
Winners: 2004, 2007
Rugby World Cup / Webb Ellis Cup
Winners: 2007
Tri Nations
Winners: 2004
Runners-up: 2005
Freedom Cup
Winners: 2004
Mandela Challenge Plate
Winners: 2005
Prince William Cup
Winners: 2007

South Africa U23
Africa Cup
Winners: 2000

Mighty Elephants
Vodacom Cup
Shield: 2002

Stormers (as head coach)
Super 14
Runners-up: 2010

Western Province''
Currie Cup
Winners: 2012, 2014
Runners-up: 2010, 2013, 2015

References

External links
 
 

Living people
1963 births
People from Makhanda, Eastern Cape
South Africa national rugby union team coaches
South African rugby union coaches
Eastern Province Elephants players
Cape Coloureds
Sportspeople from the Eastern Cape